Tristan Psionic was a Canadian indie rock band. The band members also founded the music label Sonic Unyon.

History
Triston Psionic was formed in 1991 in an industrial warehouse loft in Hamilton, Ontario. The band consisted of vocalist Sandy McIntosh, guitarist Mark Milne, bassist Gary "Wool" McMaster and Wet Spots drummer Doug Lea. The band was named after a pet. This lineup recorded a cassette, Psix Psong Demo.

Tim Potocic replaced Doug on drums in 1993. The band formed its own label, Sonic Unyon Records, to release its albums; their first album was The Sounds of Tristan Psionic. and developed the imprint into one of Canada's largest independent labels.

After Wool's departure, Heimlich Maneuver bassist Peter Kirkpatrick was enlisted to help write and record TPA Flight 028 and was replaced by April Sabucco shortly thereafter. Sabucco was in turn replaced by Rob Higgins on the band's final release, Mind the Gap.

Discography
 Psix Psong Demo (Indie Cassette, 1992)
 The Sounds of Tristan Psionic (Sonic Unyon, 1994)
 TPA Flight 028 (Sonic Unyon, 1996)
 Mind the Gap (Sonic Unyon, 2000)

Other releases 
 The Allied Nations Victory (Sonic Unyon, 1999), split 7-inch with Primrods

References

External links
 Tristan Psionic at New Music Canada
 [ Tristan Psionic] at Allmusic
 Sonic Unyon Records

Musical groups established in 1992
Musical groups disestablished in 2010
Musical groups from Hamilton, Ontario
Canadian indie rock groups
1992 establishments in Ontario
2010 disestablishments in Ontario
Sonic Unyon artists